The partial specific volume  express the variation of the extensive volume of a mixture in respect to composition of the masses. It is the partial derivative of volume with respect to the mass of the component of interest.

where  is the partial specific volume of a component  defined as:

The PSV is usually measured in milliLiters (mL) per gram (g), proteins > 30 kDa can be assumed to have a partial specific volume of 0.708 mL/g. Experimental determination is possible by measuring the natural frequency of a U-shaped tube filled successively with air, buffer and protein solution.

Properties
The sum of partial specific volumes of a mixture or solution is an inverse of density of the mixture namely the specific volume of the mixture.

Notes

See also
Partial molar property
Apparent molar property

Density